The Xiushan Stadium is a multi-purpose stadium in Chongqing, China.  It is currently used mostly for football matches and also for athletics. The capacity is 19,000.

References

Football venues in China
Multi-purpose stadiums in China